Anderson Barn, Anderson Farm or Anderson Farmstead may refer to:

In the United States

Clarence Anderson Barn, Newnata, Arkansas, listed on the NRHP in Arkansas
Anderson Barn (Johnstown, Colorado)
Hood-Anderson Farm, Eagle Rock, North Carolina, NRHP-listed
Lewis Anderson House, Barn and Granary, The Dalles, Oregon, NRHP-listed
Anderson Barn (Hitchcock, South Dakota)
Anderson-Clark Farmstead, Grantsville, Utah, listed on the NRHP in Utah
Anderson-Beletski Prune Farm, Vancouver, Washington, listed on the NRHP in Washington
D. I. B. Anderson Farm, Morgantown, West Virginia, listed on the NRHP in West Virginia

See also
Anderson Manor (disambiguation)
Anderson Hall (disambiguation)
Anderson House (disambiguation)
Anderson Historic District (disambiguation)